A Perfect Planet is a 2021 five-part earth science series presented by David Attenborough. The first episode premiered on 3 January 2021 on BBC One. Filming took place over four years, across 31 countries, with crew navigating difficulties in extreme temperatures and remote locations. The editing process was affected by the COVID-19 pandemic. The series covers volcanoes, the sun, weather and oceans, with the final episode focusing on human impact on the environment. It received positive critical reception.

Production

A nature documentarian with a lengthy career, David Attenborough is known for coverage of animal life. A Perfect Planet focuses on earth science topics and landscapes. In the context of the COVID-19 pandemic, Attenborough saw the series as well-timed, saying: "This year perhaps more than ever, people are finding comfort and solace in the natural world". The series was produced by Silverback Films, with filming beginning in 2016 and spanning 31 countries. The crew numbered around 200 and 3,000 hours of footage were captured for the series.

By the time the pandemic affected the production, it was in the editing stage, much of which was done remotely. Unable to record in his usual studio in Bristol, Attenborough converted his dining room into a sound stage by hanging duvets from the walls. He used a microphone with a lead that went into his garden, where a sound recorder listened; a producer listened and gave feedback via Zoom. To withstand bad weather, they purchased a hut for the sound recorder. A string orchestra recorded music in Iceland, one of the few places such a gathering was possible, while woodwind and brass performers recorded their parts separately from their homes.

In the U.K., the series was broadcast on Sundays in the timeslot 8p.m. on BBC One, beginning on 3 January 2021. In Canada, the series was broadcast at the same local time on BBC Earth. In the United States, the series was made available on the Discovery+ streaming service on 4 January 2021. In China, the series was broadcast on Mondays on CCTV-9 and online via Tencent Video, beginning on 4 January.

A Perfect Planet was announced in February 2019 alongside BBC commissioning of Frozen Planet II—a Frozen Planet sequel—and Planet Earth III—in the Planet Earth franchise. The series were initially scheduled for release in 2020, 2021 and 2022, respectively. Jim Waterson of The Guardian suggested that the BBC was aiming to maintain its staff with the commissioning, in the context of some BBC's Natural History Unit members leaving to join the online streaming service Netflix and Attenborough narrating their upcoming Our Planet.

Filming
The premiere "Volcano" features flamingo coverage at Lake Natron that Attenborough described as "one of the most memorable sequences [that he'd] seen on television". To get to Lake Natron, a hovercraft had to be shipped from the U.K. Crew had to wear snowshoes on mud flats to avoid burns due to the heat. Series producer Huw Cordey found the "remoteness" of the Galapagos to be a challenge while filming there.

For "The Sun", episode two, producer Nick Shoolingin-Jordan and cameraperson Rolf Steinmann both experienced technical difficulties with extreme temperatures, Shoolingin-Jordan on Ellesmere Island and in a desert, and Steinmann in the Arctic. In the desert, fabrics soaked in water were required to cool down the camera to a temperature at which it could operate, while drone cameras in the Arctic had a limited operation time between being heated up with a hairdryer and freezing immobile while filming.

"Weather" depicts the Gobi Desert, which Attenborough has not visited. The crew searched to find a camel species numbering 450 in the desert and 1000 in the world. He said: "I'm not likely to be sent there, because there aren't many animals, but there are fossils and I would love to go." The episode's producer, Ed Charles, reported that there was "literally no sound other than the whisper of the wind", describing it as a "very odd sensation". He said that several days often passed without "even a hint of another living animal". Camera operator Sophie Darlington said that not stepping on the Christmas Island red crabs seen in "Weather" was a difficulty, with crew having to rake the ground to clear the creatures away.

Charles said that the cuttlefish in "Oceans" began displaying more vibrant colours when they adjusted to the crew's presence. A wood frog in one episode freezes itself as an alternative to hibernation; to capture this action, crew filmed inside a freezer for 10 days.

The final episode, "Humans", was described by Attenborough as "the most important story of our times": it covers human impact on the environment. It shows the result of three weeks' filming on a Neptune's Navy ship. To board fishing boats, the crew would approach in small, fast boats from a distance; only boats which were fishing legally were successfully boarded. Assistant producer Emily Franke aimed to "show viewers the impact of our fishing practices".

Episodes

Reception
A Perfect Planet was one of the most popular programmes on BBC iPlayer in the first week of 2021, which saw the highest viewing figures in the platform's history.

Rating the first episode five out of five stars, The Times Carol Midgley found scenes "stunning" and "breathtaking", though filled with "torture and suffering". Anita Singh of The Telegraph gave the first episode four stars, praising the "quality of the photography" and Attenborough's narration as "spare and intelligent". Singh enjoyed the depiction of how the crew gathered footage and The Guardians Euan Ferguson also highlighted this for praise. In another four star review, The Independents Sean O'Grady found the visuals "as awesome in scale and majesty as anything that has gone before" and lauded the series' theme as "clever and novel". Ibrahim Sawal, writing for New Scientist, praised it as a "great blend of natural history and earth science", praising the content about weather and climate change as "perhaps the series' most dramatic scenes".

References

Further reading

External links
 
 A Perfect Planet OpenLearn at The Open University
 

2020s British documentary television series
2021 British television series debuts
2021 British television series endings
BBC high definition shows
BBC television documentaries about science
David Attenborough
Documentary films about nature
English-language television shows
Television series by All3Media